Mormula is a genus of sea snails, marine gastropod mollusks in the family Pyramidellidae, the pyrams and their allies.

Description
The thick shell is turreted and shaped like an awl, rissoid, solid, and longitudinally plicate . The aperture is large. The columella is spirally tortuous. The outer lip is thickened within. The margin acute.

Species
Species within the genus Mormula include:

 Mormula chrysozona (Martens, 1880)
 Mormula hirasei Kuroda, 1960
 Mormula macandreae A. Adams, 1870
 Mormula persarum Melvill & Standen, 1903
 Mormula philippiana (Dunker, 1860) 
 Mormula pseudorex (Nomura, 1936)
 Mormula rex (Pilsbry, 1904)
Species brought into synonymy
 Mormula aureocincta Kuroda & Habe, 1971: synonym of Pyrgiscus aureocinctus (Kuroda & Habe, 1971)
 Mormula excellens G.B. Sowerby III, 1907: synonym of Turbonilla aulica Dall & Bartsch, 1906
 Mormula humilis (Preston, 1905): synonym of Quirella humilis (Preston, 1905)
 Mormula rissoina A. Adams, 1864: synonym of Turbonilla philippiana Dunker, 1860
 Mormula terebra (A. Adams, 1861): synonym of Chrysallida terebra A. Adams, 1861

References

 Adams A. (1863). On the species of Pyramidellinae found in Japan. Journal of the Proceedings of the Linnean Society of London, 7: 1-6
 Odé H. (1998) Indo-Pacific taxa of turbonillids, excluding those along the Americas. Texas Conchologist 34(2): 33-103

External links
 To World Register of Marine Species

Pyramidellidae